Air Mobility Group (AMG) is one of six force element groups in the Royal Australian Air Force (RAAF). It is responsible for airlift and air-to-air refuelling operations.

Establishment and evolution
Air Mobility Group (AMG) was formed as Air Lift Group (ALG) in February 1987. Its name was changed to Air Mobility Group on 1 April 2014.

Responsibilities and bases
Airlift capabilities can be classified as:
Strategic airlift (long-distance transport between theatres, areas of operations or communication zones)
Tactical airlift (rapid and responsive movement within an area of operation)

Roles of airlift include:
Airborne operations
Air logistics support
Special operations support
VIP transport
Aeromedical evacuation

Air-to-air refuelling is classified as a force multiplier, and is also the responsibility of AMG.

Notes

References
Royal Australian Air Force. Aerospace Centre. 2002. Fundamentals of Australian Aerospace Power (4th ed). Fairbairn, A.C.T.: Aerospace Centre. 

RAAF groups
Military units and formations established in 1987
Military units and formations established in 2014
2014 establishments in Australia